Nicole Francine Aiello (born June 9, 1983), known by her stage name Frankee, is an American model and R&B singer mainly known for her 2004 single "F.U.R.B. (Fuck You Right Back)".

Career
"F.U.R.B. (Fuck You Right Back)" topped the charts in the United Kingdom in May 2004, and Australia in June 2004. While Eamon initially said that he selected Frankee to record the song at an audition, he later stated that his only involvement was in clearing the use of the music with the following statement:

After leaving Marro Records in 2006, she signed with Big Management immediately afterwards to record a new album. A single, "Watch Me", was released as a digital download in 2006. This song failed to chart, and Frankee was dropped from Big Entertainment.

Later, she worked as a model.

Discography

Albums
2004: The Good, the Bad, the Ugly
2006: Watch Me (shelved)

Singles

References

1983 births
Living people
21st-century American women singers
21st-century American singers
American contemporary R&B singers
American dance musicians
American female models
American people of Italian descent
American soul singers
Singers from New York (state)
People from Staten Island
Models from New York City